Lennart Hartmann (born 3 April 1991) is a German footballer who plays as a midfielder for BFC Preussen.

Career 
Born in Berlin, Hartmann started his professional career with Hertha BSC, making his first appearance on 31 July 2008 in the 2008–09 UEFA Cup first qualifying round second leg against Nistru Otaci. He made his Bundesliga debut on 17 August 2008 in the opening fixture against Eintracht Frankfurt when he came on in the 67th minute to replace Gojko Kačar. The appearance made him the youngest player ever to for Hertha BSC in the Bundesliga and the sixth youngest Bundesliga player of all time, at the age of 17 years and 103 days. In January 2011, Hartmann had a trial spell with Canadian club Vancouver Whitecaps.

In June 2011, Hartmann signed for the 2. Bundesliga club Alemannia Aachen. Failing to make a single appearance in six months, Hartmann left Aachen in January 2012 to join 3. Liga club SV Babelsberg 03. He left Babelsberg in July 2013 after the club were relegated to play for Berliner AK 07 in the Regionalliga Nordost, and in the summer of 2014, joined Tennis Borussia Berlin in the sixth-tier Berlin-Liga.

References

External links 
 

1991 births
Living people
Footballers from Berlin
German footballers
Germany youth international footballers
Association football midfielders
Bundesliga players
3. Liga players
Hertha Zehlendorf players
Hertha BSC players
Hertha BSC II players
Alemannia Aachen players
SV Babelsberg 03 players
Berliner AK 07 players
Tennis Borussia Berlin players
VSG Altglienicke players